The 2003 BMW Open was a men's tennis tournament played on outdoor clay courts in Munich, Germany and was part of the International Series of the 2003 ATP Tour. The tournament ran from 28 April through 4 May 2003. First-seeded Roger Federer won the singles title.

Finals

Singles

 Roger Federer defeated  Jarkko Nieminen 6–1, 6–4
 It was Federer's 3rd title of the year and the 13th of his career.

Doubles

 Wayne Black /  Kevin Ullyett defeated  Joshua Eagle /  Jared Palmer 6–3, 7–5
 It was Black's only title of the year and the 14th of his career. It was Ullyett's only title of the year and the 20th of his career.

References

External links
 Official website 
 Official website 
 ATP Tournament Profile

 
BMW Open
Bavarian International Tennis Championships
April 2003 sports events in Europe
May 2003 sports events in Europe